Shinkafi is a Local Government Area in Zamfara State, Nigeria.

It is also a surname and may refer to:

Mahmud Shinkafi, Nigerian politician, governor of Zamfara state, Nigeria from 2007 to 2011
Mamuda Aliyu Shinkafi, Nigerian politician, governor of Zamfara State in 2007 
Umaru Shinkafi (1937–2016), Nigerian politician, intelligence chief, and Federal Commissioner of Internal Affairs